The 1903–04 team finished with a record 2–6. It was the first year for head coach Wilbur P. Bowen. Wilbur Bowen became Eastern Michigan's first athletic director in 1903. The team captain was Wilbur Morris and C.B. Jordan was the team manager.

Roster

Schedule

|-
!colspan=9 style="background:#006633; color:#FFFFFF;"| Non-conference regular season

1.Media guide list game on 1/28, Detroit Free Press list the game on 1/29 and the school year book list 1/31.

2. EMU list the score as 14-34 while MSU & Detroit Free Press list the score as 10-62.

References

Eastern Michigan Eagles men's basketball seasons
Michigan State Normal